Rhodobates unicolor is a moth of the family Tineidae. It was described by Otto Staudinger in 1870. It is found in France, Spain, Italy and Greece.

References

Moths described in 1870
Tineidae
Moths of Europe